The Rugby Europe Under-18 Championship is an annual rugby union championship for Under-18 national teams, held since 2004. The championship is organised by rugby's European governing body, Rugby Europe.

It has been held alternatingly in France and Italy, except for 2012 when it was held in Spain. The past editions were won by France, who won the championship in 2004, 2007, 2008, 2009 and 2010, and England, which won it in 2005, 2006 and 2012. Ireland became the third nation to win the tournament when they beat England in the 2011 final.

History
The European Under-18 Rugby Union Championship was first held in 2004, in Treviso, Italy. It replaced the previously held European Under-18 Emergent Nations Championship, which had first been held in 2000. The first championship in 2004 was won by France.

The following two championships, held in Lille, France, in 2005 and again in Treviso in 2006, were won by England. Alternating between France and Italy, the next four championships were held in Biarritz, Treviso again, Toulon and once more in Treviso in 2010. All four were won by France. Wales and Scotland did not compete in those years, and England did not compete in 2010.

The 2011 edition of the competition saw the introduction of an elite division, above division one, the former A, made up of four teams, France, England, Wales and Ireland. The divisions below remained unchanged. It marked the first time that all countries participating in the six nations send a team to the European championship. The 2011 tournament was held in the regions of Armagnac and Bigorre, in southern France. It was won by Ireland and saw the French team not reaching the final for the first time.

England, Ireland, Wales, Scotland and Italy left the tournament for the 2016 edition.

On March 12, 2020, following the recent evolution of COVID-19, Rugby Europe has announced a suspension of all its matches and tournaments, from Friday, March 13, 2020 until April 15, 2020. On March 26 Rugby Europe has decided to extend the suspension of all its matches and tournaments for an indefinite period of time. On April 8 Rugby Europe Board of Directors decided to cancel 2019 European Under-18 Rugby Union Championship.

Format
In 2010, the championship, similar to previous editions, was organised in an A, B and C Division, with A being the highest and C the lowest. Each division consisted of eight teams and each team played three competition games, with a quarter final, semi final and final/placing game. The D division, unlike in the past, was held in a separate tournament in 2010.

The quarter finals were played according to a seeding list, with the winners moving on to the first to fourth place semi finals while the losers would enter the fifth to eighth place semi finals.

The winners of the semi finals one to four would play in the division final while the losers would play for third place. Similarly, the winners of the fifth to eighth semi finals would play for fifth place while the losers would play for seventh.

The winner of the A division was crowned European champions while the eighth placed team would be relegated to the B division. Similarly, the winner of B and C division would move up a division for 2011 while the last placed teams would be relegated. This meant, France was crowned European champions while Romania finished on the relegation spot. Portugal won the B division and earned promotion while the Ukraine was relegated and replaced by Sweden, the C champions.

The 2011 format saw the introduction of a four-team elite division. Below this level, the divisions remained unchanged but were now numbered instead of being ordered by letters.

In 2012 the modus was changed once more. The elite division now consisted of eight teams, as did the A and B divisions, with all three played at the same time and location while the C division consisted of four and the D division of three teams and were played separately.

Championship finals

Emergent nations championship

European championship

Divisional champions
Emergent nations championship 2000 to 2003:

The divisional champions from 2004 to 2010:

The divisional champions after the reorganisation in 2011:

The divisional champions after the reorganisation in 2016:

Placings
The placings in the championship in order of the 2019 results:

See also 
 Rugby Europe U20 Championship

References

External links
 FIRA-AER official website
  2010 European Under-18 Rugby Union Championship official website

 
Under-18